Apple Huang (born 28 March 1984), known by her stage name Apple, is a Taiwanese music artist.

Life and work
Apple Huang is a Hwa Kang Arts School graduate, and studied at the drama department of the Chinese Culture University. In 2001, she participated in Guess to win the classic beauty competition. Later she was selected as the first of the nine Hey Girl music group (formerly known as Black Bitter Meimei) and became the oldest member of the group. Her sister Yuri Huang and her brother Huang Yuxiang are also in the entertainment industry.

On 17 March 2010, Apple joined A Legend Star Entertainment Corp. After the disbanding of "Hey Girl" she has been appearing in television variety shows.

Programmes

Presiding
Channel V
Blackie Lollipop (Off air)
Blackie's Teenage Club (Off air)
Meimei Pu Pu Feng (Off air)
First Mo Fan Bang Bang Tang assistant (Off air)
Where 5.com (Also Owodog, Liljay, Awayne Liu and Chiago Liu presided over) (7 September to 30 November 2008) (Off air)
TVBS-G
Yule Xinwen - Meimeib Ao1 4b Ao1 4 (Off air)
Zhongshi
Guess Assistant Moderator (Off air)
Next TV
Yi Shitang
Qita
2007 Taipei New Year's Eve Countdown Party
EBC Eastern Super Vision
I Love The Man on behalf of the class presided over
Chinese Television System
10 Point Hall of Fame on behalf of the class presided over
Hong Kong Now TV
18/22 (with Blackie Chen and Tina Chou)
MTV Taiwan
Wo Ai Ouxiang Idol of Asia (with Wu Jianheng and Liljay)

Discography

Albums
Blackie's Teenage Club (14 July 2006, Linfair Records)
Meimei Simi De Yitian ─ Fenhong Gao Ya Dian (15 December 2006, Linfair Records)
Meimei Simi Party (7 June 2007, Linfair Records)
Brown Sugar Macchiato TV Soundtrack (CD+DVD) (31 August 2007, Gold Typhoon Capitol Music Group)
Hey Girl Debut Album of the Same Name (29 August 2008, Warner Music Taiwan)

Music videos
Ouhan Sheng:
Youxi Aiqing music video actress (song included in the album Dong Qilai, August 1999)

Rene Liu:
Light (song included in the album A Whole Night, 9 December 2005)

Will Pan:
Yi Zhi Shengong (song included in the album Gaoshou, 22 December 2005)

Kenji Wu:
Nan Yong (song included in the album General Order,  13 October 2006)

Hey Girl-Fenhong Gao Ya Dian: (15 December 2006)
Wo Yao Ai De Hao
123 Mutouren

Hey Girl:
Wo Ai Hei Sei Se Hui (29 August 2008)
Shake It Baby
Xingfu De Pao Pao
Jiao Jie Jie
OOXX
Nusheng
Ha Ku Na Ma Ta Ta

Chang Jingxiang:
Healthy Body (5 May 2017)

Filmography

Dramas

Bibliography
Apple, Yao Yao-Jiemei Wangxiang Qu X Tou Chuan Gaogenxie

Photo albums
2012
Apple Yao Yao Zimei Wangxiang Qu: Tou Chuan Gaogenxie Zhi Nu Nu Xiezhen Ji

Advertising endorsements
Edwin jeans
New Shushan Swordsman Online
Sushi Sushi
Knights Bridge girl dress
Le tea cherry micro-foam soda

Programme announcements
Guanjun Renwu
Lady Commander
Hot Door Night
Mr. Player
Super Followers (CTi Variety. CTi Entertainment)
Tiantain Yue Caishen
The Hunger Games
Malan Tianhou Chuan

References

External links

 
 

1984 births
Living people
Taiwanese television actresses
Chinese Culture University alumni
Taiwanese people of Hakka descent
21st-century Taiwanese singers
21st-century Taiwanese women singers